Brian Bentley Brown (born September 10, 1964) is a retired United States Navy vice admiral and navigator who last served as commander of the U.S. Naval Information Forces from June 2018 to May 2021. Brian became the second naval officer to assume the NAVIFOR office since it was established. In 1990, he served as a surface warfare officer and was subsequently transferred to the navy's operational arm oceanography command. He was also appointed as the chief  of the Navy Space Cadre.

He was later promoted from rear admiral to vice admiral before assuming the NAVIFOR office.

Biography
Brian Brown graduated in 1986 from the U.S. Naval Academy with a Bachelor of Science in Oceanography, and then went to the Scripps Institution of Oceanography at the University of California, San Diego where he earned a Master of Science in Oceanography in 1987. Later from the Naval Postgraduate School, he completed an MSc in Meteorology and Physical Oceanography in 1997.

He was assigned to command the naval oceanographic offices, including Naval Meteorology and Oceanography Command at Jacksonville as well as San Diego. As a placement officer, and assistant oceanography community manager, he was assigned to the Navy Personnel Command and executive assistant to the navigator in the Office of the Chief of Naval Operations.

In June 2014, Brown served as deputy commander of United States Strategic Command for JFCC component Joint Functional Component Command for Space and Global Strike and later in November, he was appointed to the Space Cadre of US Navy.

Brown was relieved as commander of NAVIFOR by Vice Admiral Kelly Aeschbach on May 7, 2021. His retirement ceremony was held on July 1, 2021.

References

1964 births
Living people
People from Garden Grove, California
United States Naval Academy alumni
Scripps Institution of Oceanography alumni
Naval Postgraduate School alumni
American oceanographers
Recipients of the Legion of Merit
United States Navy vice admirals
Military personnel from California